Bret Maverick is an American Western television series that starred James Garner in the title role, a professional poker player in the Old West. The series aired on NBC from December 1, 1981 to May 4, 1982. It is a sequel series to the 1957-1962 ABC series Maverick, as well the short-lived 1979 TV series Young Maverick, and that series' pilot, the 1978 TV movie The New Maverick, all of which starred Garner in the same role (though he appeared only briefly in Young Maverick). In the two previous series, Bret Maverick had been a solitary rounder who travels from riverboat to saloon looking for high-stakes games. In this series, Maverick has settled down in Sweetwater, Arizona Territory, where he owns a ranch (The Lazy Ace) and is co-owner of the town's saloon (The Red Ox). However, he is still always on the lookout for his next big score, and continues to gamble and practice various con games whenever the chance arises. The series was developed by Gordon Dawson, and produced by Garner's company Cherokee Productions (mistakenly dubbed "Comanche Productions" on the end credits) in association with Warner Bros. Television.

Series overview
Almost two decades after the original Maverick series, and a few years after his appearance in the 1978 TV movie The New Maverick, Bret Maverick has put down roots in the frontier community of Sweetwater, Arizona Territory where he's now the silent partner of the Red Ox saloon that he won in a card game. Maverick's still a gambler, and is not above running various con games to help make the money he needs to keep his businesses afloat.  Because of this, he is viewed with suspicion by many of the town's more prominent citizens, especially the town's newly appointed sheriff.

Bret's business partner is Tom Guthrie (Ed Bruce), the town's former sheriff and co-owner of the Red Ox Saloon.  (Actor Ed Bruce, a noted country singer, also co-wrote and performed the show's theme song.)  Bret's penchant for organizing cons and money-making schemes of questionable legality means that he and ex-sheriff Guthrie are often at odds with each other, although they still remain friends.  Also seen as series regulars are Richard Hamilton as Cy Whitaker, the aging but feisty foreman of Maverick's ranch;  Ramon Bieri as prosperous local banker Elijah Crow; Darleen Carr as Mary Lou "M.L." Springer, the fetching owner, editor, and photographer of the local newspaper; David Knell as Rodney Catlow. M.L.'s young assistant; and John Shearin as Mitchell Dowd, the town's arrogant and ineffectual sheriff.

Also seen frequently are three actors who were carry-overs from Garner's previous series The Rockford Files. Stuart Margolin ("Angel" on The Rockford Files) appears in a recurring role as crooked Native American Philo Sandeen; frequent Rockford Files bit player Jack Garner (James' brother) plays the role of Jack, the Red Ox's bespectacled bartender; and Luis Delgado (James Garner's longtime stand-in, and "Officer Billings" on Rockford) plays Red Ox employee Shifty Delgrado. Semi-regulars included Tommy Bush as the inept but friendly Deputy Sturgess, and Marj Dusay as Kate Hanrahan, the town's local madam.

U.S. television ratings

Cancellation and aftermath
Despite respectable ratings, the show was canceled by NBC at the end of the first season, airing only eighteen episodes. Writer/producer Roy Huggins, original creator of the title character but otherwise unconnected with this series despite Garner's request that he come aboard mid-season, speculated that one reason the new show didn't quite work was that Maverick, traditionally a drifter, had settled down in one place. Also, several costumes and hairstyles, particularly of series regular Darleen Carr, reflected the style of the 1980s and not the old west in which the show was set. Jack Kelly, who had alternated the lead with Garner and later Roger Moore in the original 1957–62 Maverick series, had been slated to return as Bret's brother Bart Maverick in the second season, and briefly appeared at the very end of the only season.

A number of scripts for the following season had been written and presented to Kelly, according to subsequent interviews; Bart was going to look after the saloon in Arizona while Bret ranged across the West, thereby making this series closer in conception and tone to the original Maverick. The series' final episode also included a number of other changes to the series set-up: notably, Tom Guthrie was re-elected as sheriff, and sold his interest in the Red Ox to Kate Hanrahan, who immediately reinvented the establishment as an upscale brothel. As well, Mitchell Dowd was appointed to a government position as an inspector of bars and hotels throughout the Arizona territory, where he promised to remain a thorn in Maverick's side.
 
The 2-hour first episode was eventually trimmed and repackaged as a TV movie for rerunning on local stations under the title Bret Maverick: The Lazy Ace. Additionally the series' only two-part episode was similarly repackaged as Bret Maverick: Faith, Hope and Clarity. NBC took the unusual step of rerunning the episodes two additional times - in the summer of 1988 to help provide 'new' programming during a writers strike, and in the summer of 1994 to play off publicity surrounding the Mel Gibson movie remake of the original Maverick series also featuring Garner.

As a tribute to the character featured on this television series and on Maverick, on April 21, 2006, a ten-foot bronze statue of James Garner as Bret Maverick was unveiled in Garner's hometown of Norman, Oklahoma, with Garner present at the ceremony.

Regular cast

 James Garner as Bret Maverick
 Ed Bruce as Tom Guthrie
 Ramon Bieri as Elijah Crow
 John Shearin as Mitchel Dowd
 David Knell as Rodney Catlow
 Richard Hamilton as Cy Whittaker
 Stuart Margolin as Philo Sandeen
 Darleen Carr as Mary Lou Springer
 Jack Garner as Jack the bartender
 Tommy Bush as Deputy Sturgess

Episode list

DVD release
On April 22, 2014, Warner Bros. released Bret Maverick: The Complete Series on  DVD in Region 1 for the very first time, via their Warner Archive Collection. This is a manufacture-on-demand release, available exclusively through Warner's online store and only in the United States.

Syndication
The series has rerun on Encore Westerns since fall 2008. On December 30, 2018, U.S. TV network getTV started rerunning the series.

Currently, it airs on getTV on the weekends.

See also
List of Maverick episodes

References

External links
 
James Garner Interview on the Charlie Rose Show

1981 American television series debuts
1982 American television series endings
English-language television shows
Maverick
NBC original programming
Television series by Warner Bros. Television Studios
1980s Western (genre) television series
Television shows set in Arizona
Maverick (TV series)